ICON Yachts is a Dutch shipbuilding company headquartered in Harlingen, Netherlands.

ICON Yachts is a highly specialized shipyard for yacht conversion and refit projects, which has established a leading position in the sector of Explorer yachts and purpose vessels.

Since 2021, ICON Yachts group is owned by Mr. Micca Ferrero, a prominent Swiss businessman.

The shipyard 
The shipyard is located outside the historic port of Harlingen and it has unrestricted open-water access from locks and bridges. The yard facilities include a 150 x 33m covered and heated dry dock with a 7.5m maximum draft and a 90m long floating dock. ICON Yachts strategic site has been crucial in defining the company's specialization in conversions and refits.

Lloyd's Register awarded ICON Yachts ISO 9001 and ISO 14001 certifications. Thus, since 2021, the shipyard uses 100% green energy and it was the first Dutch shipbuilding company to be awarded with the ISO 14001.

History
ICON Yachts was founded in late 2005 by the investor Ton Van Dam and Alex Shnaider, former F1 team owner and real estate investor. The founders were shortly after joined by business partners, who helped further the shipyard's growth.

In its early years, ICON Yachts launched several superyachts. In 2009, the 67.50 m (221.5 ft) superyacht Icon was launched in collaboration with the renowned British Yacht Designers Redman Whiteley Dixon, which carried out her exterior design. Afterward, ICON Yachts created Baton Rouge, Basmalina II and Party Girl.

In 2015, ICON Yachts launched MY LEGEND (77m), one of the shipyard’s greatest refit works. The original vessel, an ice-breaking tug named MV GIANT, underwent an extensive refit/conversion that was conducted at the Dutch shipyard in a short amount of time. Upon completion, the vessel was renamed MY LEGEND and she is now one of the first ice-capable yachts with Lloyds 1A Ice Class.

In August 2017, ICON Yachts signed a contract to convert the commercial motor vessel Sanaborg, a 68m icebreaker built by Koninklijke Niestern Sander, into a luxury superyacht. In 2020, in association with the UK design team RWD, ICON launched RAGNAR (68m), an eye-catcher Explorer Yacht that turned into the brand’s flagship piece. RAGNAR prides itself on a unique style, which includes medieval war craftsmanship and British heritage.

Since 2020, Tony Gale has headed the company.

The shipyard is currently working on two massive 70-meter conversion projects, Project MASTER and Project UFO. The former, at a slightly more advanced stage, includes a collaboration with the world-famous designer and naval architect Espen Øino, who will be responsible for the superyacht's new appearances.

List of yachts built/rebuilt

Rebuilts

Under construction

See also
 List of motor yachts by length
 MY Icon
 MY Baton Rouge
 MY Party Girl
 RAGNAR

References

External links
 

Yachting
Shipbuilding companies of the Netherlands
Vehicle manufacturing companies established in 2005